Sushi Yoshitake is a Michelin 3-star sushi restaurant in Ginza, Chūō, Tokyo, Japan. It is owned and operated by sushi chef Masahiro Yoshitake.

Restaurant
Masahiro Yoshitake has been described as less traditional than his competitors. Sushi Yoshitake was awarded three Michelin-stars in 2012, the year of its induction into the Michelin Guide.

Hong Kong
Masahiro Yoshitake has expanded overseas opening the eight-seat Michelin 3-star restaurant, Sushi Shikon, in Hong Kong.

See also
 List of Japanese restaurants
 List of Michelin three starred restaurants
 List of sushi restaurants

References

External links
 

Tourist attractions in Tokyo
Restaurants in Tokyo
Michelin Guide starred restaurants in Japan
Sushi restaurants in Japan